The Canon PowerShot SX520 HS is a digital compact camera announced by Canon Inc. on July 29, 2014. The Point-and-shoot superzoom camera has a 16 megapixel sensor, 42x optical zoom, and full 1080p HD video capabilities. It replaced the SX 510 HS from previous year. The zoom was increased from 30x to 42x but unlike SX510 HS it does not support WiFi transfer for images and videos.

This camera is equipped with optical Image Stabilization technology, which reduces camera shake during videos and photo shooting and has a very good stabilizer. 
This camera records video in up to 1080p Full HD, with stereo sound via the two microphones located on the top of the camera.

References

SX520 HS
Cameras introduced in 2014
Superzoom cameras